Olszowiec may refer to:
Olszowiec, Lublin County in Lublin Voivodeship (east Poland)
Olszowiec, Puławy County in Lublin Voivodeship (east Poland)
Olszowiec, Opoczno County in Łódź Voivodeship (central Poland)
Olszowiec, Radomsko County in Łódź Voivodeship (central Poland)
Olszowiec, Tomaszów Mazowiecki County in Łódź Voivodeship (central Poland)
Olszowiec, Subcarpathian Voivodeship (south-east Poland)
Olszowiec, Gmina Brochów in Masovian Voivodeship (east-central Poland)
Olszowiec, Gmina Iłów in Masovian Voivodeship (east-central Poland)